Mozvar (also Romanized as Mozaver, Mazūr, and Mazvar; also known as Majwār) is a village in Baqerabad Rural District, in the Central District of Mahallat County, Markazi Province, Iran. At the 2006 census, its population was 73, in 26 families.

References 

Populated places in Mahallat County